Lie to Me is the second studio album by the American blues guitarist Jonny Lang, released on January 28, 1997. It is Lang's big-label debut, released a day before he turned 16.

Track listing
 "Lie to Me" (Bruce McCabe/David Z) - 4:11
 "Darker Side" (McCabe) - 5:07
 "Good Morning Little Schoolgirl" (Sonny Boy Williamson) - 4:15
 "Still Wonder" (Kevin Bowe) - 3:45
 "Matchbox" (Ike Turner) - 3:29
 "Back for a Taste of Your Love" (Syl Johnson/Darryl Carter/Brenda Johnson) - 3:32
 "A Quitter Never Wins" (Tinsley Ellis/Margaret Simpson) - 5:56
 "Hit the Ground Running" (Michael Lunn/Jeff Silbar) - 3:31
 "Rack 'Em Up" (McCabe) - 4:07
 "When I Come to You" (Jonny Lang/Dennis Morgan) - 4:58
 "There's Gotta Be a Change" (Gwendolyn Collins) - 4:11
 "Missing Your Love" (Lang/Morgan) - 3:53

Personnel
 Jonny Lang - vocals, lead guitar
 Bruce McCabe - piano, clavinet, backing vocals
 Bekka Bramlett - backing vocals
 Billy Franze - rhythm guitar
 Dennis Morgan - acoustic guitar
 Doug Bartenfeld - rhythm guitar
 Rob Stupka - drums
 David Smith - bass guitar
 Tom Tucker - engineer
 Mark Pagliaro - Guitar Tech

Charts

Weekly charts

Year-end charts

References

Jonny Lang albums
1997 albums
A&M Records albums